A list of films produced by the Marathi language film industry based in Maharashtra in the year 1936.

1936 Releases
A list of Marathi films released in 1936.

References

External links
Gomolo - 

Lists of 1936 films by country or language
1936
1936 in Indian cinema